= Rise of Islam =

Rise of Islam may refer to:

- Early Muslim conquests
- Spread of Islam
